The University of Bari Aldo Moro is a state-supported higher education institution founded in 1925 in Bari, Apulia, in Southern Italy. The university is one of the most prestigious universities in southern Italy and it is one of the largest in Italy, with a student population of around 60,000. A recent name change refers to the statesman Aldo Moro (1916-1978), a student of law there until 1939 who then served as ordinary professor of philosophy of Law and Colonial Policy (1941) and of Criminal Law (1942).

Organization 
The University of Bari is divided into various faculties. Each faculty has its own set of departments that focus on the arts sciences, mathematics, social sciences, literature, medicine, law, and education. These are the 13 faculties in which the university is divided into:

 Faculty of Agricultural Science
 Faculty of Arts and Philosophy
 Faculty of Biotechnological Sciences
 Faculty of Communication Studies
 Faculty of Economics
 Faculty of Educational Science
 Faculty of Foreign Languages and Literatures
 Faculty of Law
 Faculty of Mathematics, Physics and Natural Science
 Faculty of Medicine and Surgery
 Faculty of Pharmacy
 Faculty of Political Science
 Faculty of Veterinary Medicine
 Ionian Department of Law and Economics (Taranto)
The university offers various courses for undergraduate, graduate and post-graduate students. Aside from teaching, the university is also focused on scientific research at the doctorate level. The University of Bari research centres are highly-interactive, having connections among different departments, universities, and other research centres.

Rankings 
The university has been awarded the following ranking positions:
ranked 359 by the Center for World University Rankings (CWUR) (2016)
ranked 437 by the CWTS Leiden Ranking (2016)
ranked 401–500, Times Higher Education (THE) World University Ranking (2016)
ranked over 500th position by Academic Ranking of World Universities (ARWU) (2016)
ranked over 700th position by QS World University Rankings (2016)

The university is one of the 48 Italian higher education institutions in the CWUR list of the top 1000 universities in the world for 2016. Moreover, it has been ranked between 151st and 200th in the world for Physics by Academic Ranking of World Universities (ARWU) - Shanghai Jiao Tong University (2015).

Points of interest
 Orto Botanico dell'Università di Bari

See also
 List of Italian universities
 Institute for Chemical-Physical Processes

References

External links
University of Bari Website
University of Bari Guide for Foreign Students

 
University of Bari
Educational institutions established in 1925
Buildings and structures in the Province of Bari
Education in Apulia
1925 establishments in Italy
Aldo Moro